Union of Communists of Dahomey (in French: Union des communistes du Dahomey) was a communist party in Benin. UCD was founded in 1976. In 1977 UCD gave birth to the Communist Party of Dahomey.

1976 establishments in Benin
1977 disestablishments in Benin
Political parties established in 1976
Political parties disestablished in 1977
Communist parties in Benin
Anti-revisionist organizations
Hoxhaist parties
Defunct political parties in Benin